Georges Arlin (17 May 1902 – 27 January 1992) was a French field hockey player. He competed in the men's tournament at the 1928 Summer Olympics.

References

External links
 

1902 births
1992 deaths
French male field hockey players
Olympic field hockey players of France
Field hockey players at the 1928 Summer Olympics
People from Écully
Sportspeople from Lyon Metropolis
20th-century French people